Zakhele Mbhele (born 9 November 1984) is a South African politician. A Member of Parliament of the Democratic Alliance in the National Assembly, Mbhele served as Media Liaison Officer for Western Cape Premier Helen Zille from November 2011 to May 2014. In the 2014 general election, Mbhele was elected to parliament.  He is currently (as of July 2016) DA shadow minister of police.

Personal life and education
Mbhele is openly gay, making him the first openly gay Black member of parliament. He is one of a number of openly LGBT members of parliament, alongside fellow DA MPs Mike Waters and Ian Ollis. While attending University of Witwatersrand, he led ACTIVATE, the university’s LGBT campus group, and later served on the board of Joburg Pride. He was cited by the Mail & Guardian as one of "Top 200 Young South Africans" for his Civil Society work in 2010.

References

South African LGBT politicians
Living people
Democratic Alliance (South Africa) politicians
Members of the National Assembly of South Africa
1984 births
Gay politicians
University of Johannesburg alumni
University of the Witwatersrand alumni
Place of birth missing (living people)
LGBT legislators